Jeremy Bernard Corbyn (born 26 May 1949) is a British politician who served as Leader of the Opposition and Leader of the Labour Party from 2015 to 2020. On the political left of the Labour Party, Corbyn describes himself as a socialist. He has been Member of Parliament (MP) for Islington North since 1983. Corbyn sits in the House of Commons as an independent, having had the whip suspended in October 2020. On 15 February 2023, Labour leader Keir Starmer said that Corbyn would not be a candidate for the party at the next election.

Born in Chippenham, Wiltshire, and raised in Wiltshire and Shropshire, Corbyn joined the Labour Party as a teenager. Moving to London, he became a trade union representative. In 1974, he was elected to Haringey Council and became Secretary of Hornsey Constituency Labour Party until being elected as the MP for Islington North in 1983; he has been reelected to the office nine times. His activism has included roles in Anti-Fascist Action, the Anti-Apartheid Movement, the Campaign for Nuclear Disarmament, and advocating for a united Ireland and Palestinian statehood. As a backbench MP, Corbyn routinely voted against the Labour whip, including New Labour governments under Tony Blair and Gordon Brown. A vocal opponent of the Iraq War, he chaired the Stop the War Coalition from 2011 to 2015, a period when he received the Gandhi International Peace Award; he also won the Seán MacBride Peace Prize in 2017. Analyses of domestic media coverage of Corbyn have found it to be critical or antagonistic. Corbyn has condemned antisemitism, but has been criticised by political opponents for his past associations with individuals accused of antisemitism, and an Equality and Human Rights Commission inquiry into antisemitism found the Labour Party under his leadership was responsible for unlawful acts of discrimination and harassment.

Corbyn was elected Leader of the Labour Party in 2015. The party's membership increased sharply, both during the leadership campaign and following his election. Taking the party to the left, he advocated renationalising public utilities and railways, a less interventionist military policy, and reversals of austerity cuts to welfare and public services. Although critical of the European Union, he supported continued membership in the 2016 referendum. After Labour MPs sought to remove him in 2016, he won a second leadership contest. In the 2017 general election, Labour increased its share of the vote to 40%, with its 9.6% vote rise their largest improvement since the 1945 general election. This resulted in a net gain of 30 seats and a hung parliament, but the Conservative Prime Minister, Theresa May, formed a minority government and Labour remained in Opposition.

In 2019, after deadlock in Parliament over Brexit, Corbyn endorsed holding a referendum on the withdrawal agreement, with a personal stance of neutrality. In the 2019 general election, Labour's vote share fell to 32%, leading to a net loss of 60 seats and leaving it with 202, its fewest since 1935. Corbyn said he would not lead Labour into the next election, triggering a leadership election in 2020 that was won by Keir Starmer, his Shadow Brexit Secretary. Corbyn was suspended from Labour Party membership in October 2020 after stating antisemitism in the party had been overstated for political reasons. The membership suspension was lifted a month later after Corbyn was issued with a formal warning by a party disciplinary panel, but the Labour leadership declined to restore the whip, denying readmission to the parliamentary party.

Early life

Corbyn was born on 26 May 1949 in Chippenham, Wiltshire, and lived until the age of seven in the nearby village of Kington St Michael. He is the youngest of the four sons of Naomi Loveday (née Josling; 1915–1987), a maths teacher, and David Benjamin Corbyn (1915–1986), an electrical engineer and expert in power rectifiers. His brother Piers Corbyn is a physicist, meteorologist and weather forecaster. His parents were Labour Party members and peace campaigners who met in the 1930s at a committee meeting in support of the Spanish Republic at Conway Hall during the Spanish Civil War.

When Corbyn was seven, the family moved to Pave Lane in Shropshire, where his father bought Yew Tree Manor, a 17th-century farmhouse which was once part of the Duke of Sutherland's Lilleshall estate. Corbyn attended Castle House School, an independent preparatory school near Newport, Shropshire, before, at the age of 11, becoming a day student at the Adams Grammar School in the town.

While still at school, Corbyn became active in The Wrekin constituency Young Socialists, his local Labour Party, and the League Against Cruel Sports. He joined the Labour Party at the age of 16 and achieved two A-Levels, at grade E, the lowest-possible passing grade, before leaving school at 18. Corbyn joined the Campaign for Nuclear Disarmament (CND) in 1966 while at school and later became one of its three vice-chairs and subsequently vice-president. Around this time, he also campaigned against the Vietnam War.

After school, Corbyn worked briefly as a reporter for a local newspaper, the Newport and Market Drayton Advertiser. At around the age of 19, he spent two years doing Voluntary Service Overseas in Jamaica as a youth worker and geography teacher. He subsequently travelled through Latin America in 1969 and 1970, visiting Brazil, Argentina, Uruguay and Chile. While in Brazil he participated in a student demonstration in São Paulo against the Brazilian military government. He also attended a May Day march in Santiago, where the atmosphere around Salvador Allende's Popular Unity alliance which swept to power in the Chilean elections of 1970 made an impression on him: "[I] noticed something very different from anything I had experienced... What Popular Unity and Allende had done was weld together the folk tradition, the song tradition, the artistic tradition and the intellectual tradition".

Early career and political activities
Returning to the UK in 1971, he worked as an official for the National Union of Tailors and Garment Workers. Corbyn began a course in Trade Union Studies at North London Polytechnic but left after a year without a degree after a series of arguments with his tutors over the curriculum. He worked as a trade union organiser for the National Union of Public Employees (NUPE) and Amalgamated Engineering and Electrical Union, where his union was approached by Tony Benn and "encouraged ... to produce a blueprint for workers' control of British Leyland"; the plans did not proceed after Benn was moved to a different Department.

He was appointed a member of a district health authority and in early 1974, at the age of 24, he was elected to Haringey Council in South Hornsey ward. After boundary changes in 1978 he was re-elected in Harringay ward as councillor, remaining so until 1983. As a delegate from Hornsey to the Labour Party Conference in 1978, Corbyn successfully moved a motion calling for dentists to be employed by the NHS rather than as private contractors. He also spoke in another debate, describing a motion calling for greater support for law and order as "more appropriate to the National Front than to the Labour Party".

Corbyn became the local Labour Party's agent and organiser, and had responsibility for the 1979 general election campaign in Hornsey.

Around this time, he became involved with the London Labour Briefing, where he was a contributor. Described by The Times in 1981 as "Briefings founder", The Economist in a 1982 article named Corbyn as "Briefings general secretary figure", as did a profile on Corbyn compiled by parliamentary biographer Andrew Roth in 2004, which states that he joined the editorial board as General Secretary in 1979. Michael Crick in his 2016 edition of Militant says Corbyn was "a member of the editorial board", as does Lansley, Goss and Wolmar's 1989 work, The Rise and Fall of the Municipal Left. Corbyn said these reports were inaccurate in 2017, telling Sophy Ridge "I read the magazine. I wrote for the magazine. I was not a member of the editorial board. I didn't agree with it."

He worked on Tony Benn's unsuccessful deputy leadership campaign in 1981. He was keen to allow former International Marxist Group member Tariq Ali to join the party, despite Labour's National Executive having declared him unacceptable, and declared that "so far as we are concerned ... he's a member of the party and he'll be issued with a card." In May 1982, when Corbyn was chairman of the Constituency Labour Party, Ali was given a party card signed by Corbyn; in November the local party voted by 17 to 14 to insist on Ali's membership "up to and including the point of disbandment of the party".

In the July 1982 edition of Briefing, Corbyn opposed expulsions of the Trotskyist and entryist group Militant, saying that "If expulsions are in order for Militant, they should apply to us too." In the same year, he was the "provisional convener" of "Defeat the Witch-Hunt Campaign", based at Corbyn's then address. The Metropolitan Police's Special Branch monitored Corbyn for two decades, until the early 2000s, as he was "deemed to be a subversive". According to the Labour Party, "The Security Services kept files on many peace and Labour movement campaigners at the time, including anti-Apartheid activists and trade unionists".

Parliamentary backbencher (1983–2015)

Labour in opposition (1982–1997)
Corbyn was selected as the Labour Party candidate for the constituency of Islington North, in February 1982, winning the final ballot for selection by 39 votes against 35 for GLC councillor Paul Boateng, who in 1987 became one of the first three Black British Members of Parliament (MP). At the 1983 general election he was elected MP for the constituency, defeating the Independent Labour incumbent Michael O'Halloran, and immediately joined the socialist Campaign Group, later becoming secretary of the group.

Shortly after being elected to Parliament, he began writing a weekly column for the left-wing Morning Star newspaper. In May 2015, he said that "the Star is the most precious and only voice we have in the daily media". In February 2017, the Morning Star said of Corbyn: "He has been bullied, betrayed and ridiculed, and yet he carries on with the same grace and care he always shows to others – however objectionable their behaviour and treatment of him might be."

In 1983, Corbyn spoke on a "no socialism without gay liberation" platform and continued to campaign for LGBT rights.

He was a campaigner against apartheid in South Africa, serving on the National Executive of the Anti-Apartheid Movement, and was arrested in 1984 while demonstrating outside South Africa House, leading, decades later, to a viral image of Corbyn being arrested circulated by supporters on social media. This was as a member of the City of London Anti-Apartheid Group (CLAAG) who carried out a "non-stop picket" for 1,408 days to campaign for Nelson Mandela's release from prison. The Anti-Apartheid Movement did not support this protest, as they had agreed not to demonstrate within 30 feet of the embassy, and the picket failed to gain support from the London ANC; Mandela's failure to respond to CLAAG following his release from prison in 1990 is frequently described as a 'snub'.

He supported the 1984–85 miners' strike. In 1985, he invited striking miners into the gallery of the House of Commons; they were expelled for shouting: "Coal not dole". At the end of the strike Corbyn was given a medallion by the miners in recognition of his help.

In 1985, he was appointed national secretary of the newly launched Anti-Fascist Action.

During the BBC's Newsnight in 1984, Conservative MP Terry Dicks said that so-called Labour "scruffs" (such as Corbyn, who at this time was known for wearing an old polo-necked sweater to the Commons) should be banned from addressing the House of Commons unless they maintained higher standards. Corbyn responded, saying that: "It's not a fashion parade, it's not a gentleman's club, it's not a bankers' institute, it's a place where the people are represented."

In 1990, Corbyn opposed the poll tax (formally known as the Community Charge) and nearly went to jail for not paying the tax. He appeared in court the following year as a result.

Corbyn supported the campaign to overturn the convictions of Jawad Botmeh and Samar Alami for the 1994 bombing of the Israeli Embassy in London which argued that there was insufficient evidence to tie them to the act, along with Amnesty International, Unison and a number of journalists and other MPs. Botmeh and Alami had admitted possessing explosives and guns but denied they were for use in Britain. The convictions were upheld by the High Court of Justice in 2001 and by the European Court of Human Rights in 2007.

Corbyn sat on the Social Security Select Committee from 1992 to 1997.

Irish politics
A longstanding supporter of a united Ireland, in the 1980s Corbyn met Sinn Féin leader Gerry Adams a number of times. Corbyn consistently stated that he maintained links with Sinn Fein in order to work for a resolution to the armed conflict. According to The Sunday Times, Corbyn was involved in over 72 events connected with Sinn Féin or other pro-republican groups during the period of the IRA's paramilitary campaign.

Corbyn met Adams at the 1983 and 1989 Labour conferences (facilitated by pro-IRA Red Action) and in 1983 at Westminster, along with a number of other Labour MPs. In 1984, Corbyn and Ken Livingstone invited Adams, two convicted IRA volunteers and other members of Sinn Féin to Westminster.

During the 1980s, he campaigned on behalf of the Guildford Four and Birmingham Six, who were wrongly convicted of responsibility for IRA bombings in England in the mid-70s. In 1986, Corbyn was arrested with 15 demonstrators protesting against what they saw as weak evidence and poor treatment during the trial of a group of IRA members including Patrick Magee, who was convicted of the Brighton hotel bombing and other attacks. After refusing police requests to move from outside the court, Corbyn and the other protesters were arrested for obstruction and held for five hours before being released on bail, but were not charged.

Following the 1987 Loughgall ambush, in which eight IRA members and one civilian were shot dead by the British Army in a pre-planned ambush of an IRA attack on a Royal Ulster Constabulary base, Corbyn attended a commemoration by the Wolfe Tone Society and stated "I'm happy to commemorate all those who died fighting for an independent Ireland." Corbyn has said that he had attended the event and a minute of silence to "call for a peace and dialogue process".

He voted against the 1985 Anglo-Irish Agreement, saying "We believe that the agreement strengthens rather than weakens the border between the six and the 26 counties, and those of us who wish to see a United Ireland oppose the agreement for that reason."

In the early 1990s, MI5 opened a file on Corbyn to monitor his links to the IRA.

In 1994, Corbyn signed a Commons motion condemning the 1974 Birmingham pub bombings, which killed 21 people.

The meeting took place three weeks after the IRA's bombing of the Conservative Party leadership that killed five people. A short time after IRA plans to bomb London were foiled in 1996, Corbyn invited Adams to the House of Commons for a press conference to promote Adams' autobiography, Before the Dawn. Shadow Northern Ireland Secretary Mo Mowlam and Labour leader Tony Blair condemned the invitation, with Mowlam arguing that it was detrimental to the peace process, and Blair threatening disciplinary action. Adams cancelled the event, to save further embarrassment to Corbyn and to avoid negative publicity.

In 1998, he voted for the Good Friday Agreement, saying he looked forward to "peace, hope and reconciliation in Ireland in the future."

In 2017, Corbyn said that he had "never met the IRA", although Shadow Home Secretary Diane Abbott later clarified that although he had met members of the IRA, "he met with them in their capacity as activists in Sinn Fein".

Labour in government (1997–2010)

Between 1997 and 2010, during the most recent Labour Government, Corbyn was the Labour MP who voted most often against the party whip, including three-line whip votes. In 2005 he was identified as the second most rebellious Labour MP of all time when the party was in government. He was the most rebellious Labour MP in the 1997–2001 Parliament, the 2001–2005 Parliament and the 2005–2010 Parliament, defying the whip 428 times while Labour was in power. Jacobin described him as "a figure who for decades challenged them [Labour Party elites] from the backbench as one of the most rebellious left-wing members of parliament."

Corbyn sat on the London Regional Select Committee from 2009 to 2010.

Stop the War Coalition and anti-war activism 

In October 2001, Corbyn was elected to the steering committee of the Stop the War Coalition, which was formed to oppose the War in Afghanistan which started later that year. In 2002, Corbyn reported unrest : "there is disquiet...about issues of foreign policy" among some members of the Labour party. He cited "the deployment of troops to Afghanistan and the threat of bombing Iraq" as examples. He was vehemently opposed to the Iraq War in 2003, and spoke at dozens of anti-war rallies in Britain and overseas. He spoke at the February anti-Iraq War protest which was said to be the largest such protest in British political history. In 2006, Corbyn was one of 12 Labour MPs to support Plaid Cymru and the Scottish National Party's call for a parliamentary inquiry into the Iraq War. He was elected chair of the coalition in succession to Andrew Murray in September 2011, but resigned once he became Leader of the Labour Party in September 2015.

Parliamentary groups and activism
Corbyn is a member of a number of Parliamentary Trade Union Groups: he is sponsored by several trade unions, including UNISON, Unite and the National Union of Rail, Maritime and Transport Workers. He is a supporter of the Unite Against Fascism pressure group. Corbyn was chair of the All-Party Parliamentary Group (APPG) on the Chagos Islands, chair of the APPG on Mexico, Vice-Chair of the APPG on Latin America and vice-chair of the APPG on Human Rights. He has advocated for the rights of the forcibly removed Chagossians to return to the British Indian Ocean Territory.

Corbyn appeared on a call-in show on Press TV, an Iranian government television channel, several times between 2009 and 2012. He was criticised for appearing on the channel in light of Iran executing and imprisoning homosexuals, as well as Corbyn not questioning contributors who called the BBC "Zionist liars" and described Israel as a "disease". Corbyn said in response that he used the programme to address "human rights issues" and that his appearance fee was "not an enormous amount" and was used to help meet constituency office costs. Corbyn's final appearance was six months after the network was fined by Ofcom for its part in filming an interview with Maziar Bahari, an Iranian journalist, saying the interview had been held under duress and after torture.

Labour in opposition (2010–2015)
In the 2010 Labour Party leadership election, Corbyn supported Diane Abbott in the first round in which she was eliminated; thereafter, he supported Ed Miliband.

Corbyn was one of 16 signatories to an open letter to Ed Miliband in January 2015 calling for Labour to make a commitment to opposing further austerity, to take rail franchises back into public ownership, and to strengthen collective bargaining arrangements.

Corbyn sat on the Justice Select Committee from 2010 to 2015. Before becoming party leader Corbyn had been returned as member of Parliament for Islington North seven times, gaining 60.24% of the vote and a majority of 21,194 in the 2015 general election.

Leadership of the Labour Party (2015–2020)

Leadership election

Following the Labour Party's defeat at the general election on 7 May 2015, Ed Miliband resigned as its party leader, triggering a leadership election. Corbyn decided to stand as a candidate, having been disillusioned by the lack of a left-wing voice, and said to his local newspaper, The Islington Tribune, that he would have a "clear anti-austerity platform". He also said he would vote to scrap the Trident nuclear weapons system and would "seek to withdraw from Nato". He suggested that Britain should establish a national investment bank to boost house-building and improve economic growth and lift wages in areas that had less investment in infrastructure. He would also aim to eliminate the current budget deficit over time and restore the 50p top rate of income tax. He added: "This decision is in response to an overwhelming call by Labour Party members who want to see a broader range of candidates and a thorough debate about the future of the party. I am standing to give Labour Party members a voice in this debate". He indicated that, if he were elected, policies that he put forward would need to be approved by party members before being adopted and that he wanted to "implement the democratic will of our party". The other candidates were Shadow Home Secretary Yvette Cooper, Shadow Health Secretary Andy Burnham and Shadow Care Minister Liz Kendall. Several who nominated Corbyn later said they had ensured he had enough votes to stand, more to widen the political debate within the party than because of a desire or expectation that he would win.

At the Second Reading of the Welfare Reform and Work Bill in July 2015, Corbyn joined 47 Labour MPs to oppose the Bill, describing it as "rotten and indefensible", whilst the other three leadership candidates abstained under direction from interim leader Harriet Harman. In August 2015, he called on Iain Duncan Smith to resign as Secretary of State for Work and Pensions after it was reported that thousands of disabled people had died after being found fit to work by Work Capability Assessments (instituted in 2008) between 2011 and 2014, although this was challenged by the government and by FullFact who said that the figure included those who had died and therefore their claim had ended, rather than being found fit for work.

Corbyn rapidly became the frontrunner among the candidates and was perceived to benefit from a large influx of new members. Hundreds of supporters turned out to hear him speak at the hustings across the nation and their enthusiastic reception and support for him was dubbed "Corbynmania" by the press. A chant of "Oh, Jeremy Corbyn" was adopted as an anthem or chorus by his supporters, sung in the style of a football chant to the tune of a riff from "Seven Nation Army" by The White Stripes. The chant later attracted attention at the Glastonbury Festival of 2017, where Corbyn spoke.
Membership numbers continued to climb after the start of his leadership. In addition, following a rule change under Miliband, members of the public who supported Labour's aims and values could join the party as "registered supporters" for £3 and be entitled to vote in the election. There was speculation that the rule change would lead to Corbyn being elected by registered supporters without majority support from ordinary members. He was elected party leader in a landslide victory on 12 September 2015 with 59.5% of first-preference votes in the first round of voting. He would have won in the first round with 51% of votes, even without "£3 registered supporters", having gained the support of 49.6% of full members and 57.6% of affiliated supporters. His 40.5% majority was a larger proportional majority than that attained by Tony Blair in 1994. His margin of victory was said to be "the largest mandate ever won by a party leader".

An internal Labour Party report, entitled The work of the Labour Party's Governance and Legal Unit in relation to antisemitism, 2014–2019, which was leaked to the media in April 2020, stated that, during the 2015 and 2016 leadership contests staff members at Labour party headquarters looked for ways to exclude from voting members who they believed would vote for Corbyn. The staff members referred to this activity as "trot busting", "bashing trots" and "trot spotting".

Corbynmania

Corbynmania was the enthusiastic support for Jeremy Corbyn. Initially viewed as a token candidate for the left wing of the party and not expected to win, many new young members, who had joined after the membership fee had been reduced to £3, were attracted by what they saw as Corbyn's authentic, informal style and radical policies. Hundreds of supporters turned out to hear him speak at the hustings across the nation and their enthusiastic reception and support for him was dubbed "Corbynmania" by the press.

Jonathan Dean characterised Corbynmania as a political fandom, comparable with the enthusiastic followings of popular media stars and other modern politicians such as Bernie Sanders and Justin Trudeau. Specific features included use of the #jezwecan hashtag, attendance at rallies and the posting of pictures such as selfies on social media. Artistic, merchandising and other activity consolidated and spread this fannish enthusiasm. This included a “Jeremy Corbyn for Prime Minister” (JC4PM) tour by celebrities such as Charlotte Church, Jeremy Hardy, and Maxine Peake; a Corbyn superhero comic book; mash-ups and videos. Many of Corbyn's supporters felt he possessed personal qualities such as earnestness and modesty leading them to develop a sense of emotional attachment to him as individual. These were seen as cultish by critics such as Margaret Beckett who said in 2016 that the Labour Party had been turned into the "Jeremy Corbyn Fan Club".

A chant of "Oh, Jeremy Corbyn" was adopted as an anthem or chorus by his supporters. Sung in the style of a football chant to the tune of a riff from "Seven Nation Army" by The White Stripes, it attracted special attention at the Glastonbury Festival of 2017, where Corbyn appeared and spoke to the crowds.

Labour's weaker than expected performance in the 2018 United Kingdom local elections led to suggestions that Corbynmania had peaked.

First term as Leader of the Opposition (2015–2017)

After being elected leader, Corbyn became Leader of the Official Opposition and shortly thereafter his appointment to the Privy Council was announced. In Corbyn's first Prime Minister's Questions session as leader, he broke with the traditional format by asking the Prime Minister six questions he had received from members of the public, the result of his invitation to Labour Party members to send suggestions, for which he received around 40,000 emails. Corbyn stressed his desire to reduce the "theatrical" nature of the House of Commons, and his début was described in a Guardian editorial as "a good start" and a "long overdue" change to the tone of PMQs. He delivered his first Labour Party Conference address as leader on 29 September 2015. Party membership nearly doubled between the May 2015 election and October 2015, attributed largely to the election as leader of Corbyn.

In September 2015 an unnamed senior serving general in the British Army stated that a mutiny by the Army could occur if a future Corbyn government moved to scrap Trident, pull out of Nato or reduce the size of the armed forces. The general said "the Army just wouldn't stand for it. The general staff would not allow a prime minister to jeopardise the security of this country and I think people would use whatever means possible, fair or foul to prevent that. You can't put a maverick in charge of a country's security".

In July 2016, a study and analysis by academics from the London School of Economics of months of eight national newspaper articles about Corbyn in the first months of his leadership of Labour showed that 75% of them either distorted or failed to represent his actual views on subjects.

First Shadow Cabinet and other appointments

On 13 September 2015, Corbyn unveiled his Shadow Cabinet. He appointed his leadership campaign manager and long-standing political ally John McDonnell as Shadow Chancellor, leadership opponent Andy Burnham as Shadow Home Secretary, and Angela Eagle as Shadow First Secretary of State to deputise for him in the House of Commons. Corbyn promoted a number of female backbench MPs to Shadow Cabinet roles, including Diane Abbott, Heidi Alexander and Lisa Nandy, making his the first Shadow Cabinet with more women than men, although the most senior roles went to men. In October 2015, Corbyn appointed the Guardian journalist Seumas Milne as the Labour Party's Executive Director of Strategy and Communications.

Military intervention in Syria
After members of Islamic State carried out terrorist attacks in Paris in November 2015, Corbyn agreed with David Cameron that a political settlement between the Syrian Government and the rebels should be aimed at resolving the Syrian civil war. Prime Minister David Cameron sought to build political consensus for UK military intervention against IS targets in Syria in the days after the attacks. Corbyn warned against "external intervention" in Syria but told delegates that Labour would "consider the proposals the Government brings forward".

After Cameron set out his case for military intervention to Parliament, Corbyn held a Shadow Cabinet meeting, in which he said he would continue with efforts "to reach a common view" on Syria, while Shadow Foreign Secretary Hilary Benn suggested the case for air strikes was "compelling". Corbyn sent a letter to Labour MPs saying that he could not support military action against Islamic State: "The issue [is] whether what the Prime Minister is proposing strengthens, or undermines, our national security...I do not believe the current proposal for air strikes in Syria will protect our security and therefore cannot support it." Amid widespread reports of division in the Parliamentary Labour Party, Corbyn insisted that the final decision on whether the Labour Party would oppose air strikes rested with him. Corbyn eventually agreed that Labour MPs would be given a free vote on air strikes when the issue was voted on. 66 Labour MPs voted for the Syrian air strikes, including Hilary Benn and Deputy Labour Leader Tom Watson, while Corbyn and the majority of Labour MPs voted against.

January 2016 Shadow Cabinet reshuffle
There was widespread speculation following the vote that Corbyn would reshuffle his Shadow Cabinet to remove Hilary Benn, but Corbyn's January reshuffle retained Benn in the same position. The reshuffle prompted the resignations of three junior shadow ministers who were unhappy that Corbyn had sacked or moved shadow ministers who disagreed with his position on Syria and Trident.

On 6 January 2016, Corbyn replaced Shadow Culture Secretary Michael Dugher with Shadow Defence Secretary Maria Eagle (who was in turn replaced by Shadow Employment Minister Emily Thornberry). Thornberry, unlike Maria Eagle, is an opponent of nuclear weapons and British involvement in Syria. Corbyn also replaced Shadow Europe Minister (not attending Shadow Cabinet) Pat McFadden with Pat Glass. On 11 January 2016, Shadow Attorney General Catherine McKinnell resigned, citing party infighting, family reasons and the ability to speak in Parliament beyond her legal portfolio. She was replaced by Karl Turner.

May 2016 local elections
In the 2016 local elections, Labour had a net loss of 18 local council seats and controlled as many councils as before (gaining control of Bristol but losing Dudley). There were also Westminster by-elections in two Labour safe seats, which Labour retained: Ogmore and Sheffield Brightside and Hillsborough. The BBC's Projected National Vote Share was 31% for Labour, 30% for the Conservatives, 15% for the Liberal Democrats and 12% for UKIP. Labour candidate Sadiq Khan won the London mayorship from the Conservatives. Labour's misfortunes in Scotland continued, where they fell into third place behind the Conservatives. They retained government in Wales whilst suffering some small losses.

EU referendum

Following the 2016 United Kingdom European Union (EU) membership referendum, Corbyn was accused of "lukewarm" campaigning for Britain to remain and showing a "lack of leadership" on the issue by several party figures. Alan Johnson, who headed up the Labour In for Britain campaign said "at times" it felt as if Corbyn's office was "working against the rest of the party and had conflicting objectives". Corbyn's decision to go on holiday during the campaign was also criticised by Phil Wilson, the chair of Labour in for Britain. In September 2016, Corbyn's spokesman said Corbyn wanted access to the European Single Market, but there were "aspects" of EU membership related to privatisation "which Jeremy campaigned against in the referendum campaign." Diane Abbott, one of Corbyn's key allies, later said "Jeremy in his heart of hearts is a Brexiter". She said 
Corbyn was hostile to the European Union, which he considered it "a conspiracy of business people".

Shadow Cabinet resignations and vote of no confidence

Three days after the EU referendum, on 26 June, Hilary Benn was sacked after it was disclosed that he had been organising a mass resignation of Shadow Cabinet members to force Corbyn to stand down. Several other Shadow Cabinet members resigned in solidarity with Benn and by the following day, 23 of the 31 Shadow Cabinet members had resigned their roles, as did seven parliamentary private secretaries. On the same day, 27 June, Corbyn announced changes to his Shadow Cabinet, moving Emily Thornberry (to Shadow Foreign Secretary), Diane Abbott (to Shadow Health Secretary), and appointing Pat Glass, Andy McDonald, Clive Lewis, Rebecca Long-Bailey, Kate Osamor, Rachael Maskell, Cat Smith and Dave Anderson to his Shadow Cabinet. Just two days later one of the newly appointed members, Pat Glass, resigned, saying "the situation is untenable".

A motion of no confidence in Corbyn as Labour leader was tabled by MPs Margaret Hodge and Ann Coffey on 24 June 2016. Hodge said: "This has been a tumultuous referendum which has been a test of leadership ... Jeremy has failed that test". Shadow Chancellor John McDonnell and union leaders including Len McCluskey condemned the motion.

On 28 June, he lost the vote of confidence by Labour Party MPs by 172–40. He responded with a statement that the motion had no "constitutional legitimacy" and that he intended to continue as the elected leader. The vote did not require the party to call a leadership election, but was expected to lead to a leadership challenge. Corbyn was encouraged to resign by Tom Watson and senior Labour politicians including his predecessor, Ed Miliband. Several union leaders (from GMB, UCATT, the CWU, the TSSA, ASLEF, the FBU, the BFWAU and the NUM) issued a joint statement saying that Corbyn was "the democratically-elected leader of Labour and his position should not be challenged except through the proper democratic procedures provided for in the party's constitution" and that a leadership election would be an "unnecessary distraction".

2016 leadership challenge and election

The division between Corbyn and the Labour parliamentary party continued. On 11 July 2016, Angela Eagle, who had recently resigned from his Shadow Cabinet, formally launched her leadership campaign.
After news reports that Eagle's office had been vandalised, and threats and abuse to other MPs, including death threats to himself, Corbyn said: "It is extremely concerning that Angela Eagle has been the victim of a threatening act" and called for "respect and dignity, even where there is disagreement."

On 12 July 2016, following a dispute as to whether the elected leader would need nominations in an election as a "challenger" to their own leadership, Labour's National Executive Committee (NEC) resolved that Corbyn, as the incumbent leader, had an automatic right to be on the ballot, and also decided that members needed to have been a member for more than six months to be eligible to vote, meaning that many members who had joined recently would not be able to vote. The NEC's decision was that "registered supporters" would be entitled to vote if they paid a one off fee of £25. 184,541 people subsequently paid the one-off fee to become "registered supporters" of the party during the two-day window in July, meaning that over 700,000 people had a vote in the leadership election.
The decision to retain Corbyn on the ballot was contested unsuccessfully in a High Court action brought by Labour donor Michael Foster.

On 13 July, Owen Smith entered the Labour Party leadership race. Subsequently, on 19 July, Angela Eagle withdrew and offered her endorsement to Smith.

A survey of the public on 14 July found that 66% of those surveyed believed that the Labour party needed a new leader before the 2020 elections and only 23 per cent believed that Corbyn would make a good Prime Minister while Theresa May had an approval rating of 55 per cent. A later poll on 23 July found that among those who said they backed Labour, 54% supported Corbyn against just 22% who would prefer Smith. When voters were asked who they thought would be the best prime minister – Corbyn or Theresa May – among Labour supporters 48% said Corbyn and 22% May, among all UK voters 52% chose May and just 16% were for Corbyn.

More than 40 female Labour MPs, in an open letter during the campaign in July 2016, called on Corbyn to deal with issues relating to online abuse, and criticised him for his allegedly unsatisfactory responses and inaction. Speaking at the launch of policies intending to democratise the internet in late August, Corbyn described such abuse as "appalling". He continued: "I have set up a code of conduct on this. The Labour party has a code of conduct on this, and it does have to be dealt with".

On 16 August 2016, Corbyn released a video of himself sitting on the floor of a Virgin Trains East Coast train while travelling to a leadership hustings in Gateshead. Corbyn said the train was "ram-packed" and used this to support his policy to reverse the 1990s privatisation of the railways of Great Britain. A dispute, nicknamed Traingate in the media, developed a week later when Virgin released CCTV images appearing to show that Corbyn had walked past some available seats on the train before recording his video. Corbyn subsequently said that there had not been room for all his team to sit together, but that a train manager later found seats for him and his team, including his wife, by upgrading other passengers.

The psephologist John Curtice wrote just before Corbyn's second leadership win: "There is evidently a section of the British public, to be found particularly among younger voters, for whom the Labour leader does have an appeal; it just does not look like a section that is big enough, on its own at least, to enable Labour to win a general election". Meanwhile, on 23 September, a poll for The Independent by BMG Research suggested that working class voters were more likely to consider Corbyn "incompetent" than those from the middle class, and a higher proportion thought he was also "out of touch". Martin Kettle of The Guardian  wrote that "many Labour MPs, even some who face defeat, want an early election" to prove decisively that Corbyn's Labour is unelectable as a government, stating that "If there is hope for Labour it lies with the voters. Only they can change the party".

Corbyn was re-elected as Labour leader on 24 September, with 313,209 votes (61.8%) compared to 193,229 (38.2%) for Owen Smith – a slightly increased share of the vote compared to his election in 2015, when he won 59%. On a turnout of 77.6%, Corbyn won the support of 59% of party members, 70% of registered supporters and 60% of affiliated supporters. In his acceptance speech, Corbyn called on the "Labour family" to end their divisions and to "wipe that slate clean from today and get on with the work we've got to do as a party". He continued: "Together, arguing for the real change this country needs, I have no doubt this party can win the next election whenever the Prime Minister decides to call it and form the next government."

Article 50
In January 2017, Corbyn announced that he would impose a three-line whip to force Labour MPs to vote in favour of triggering Article 50 of the Treaty on European Union to initiate the withdrawal of the UK from the EU. In response, two Labour whips said they would vote against the bill. Tulip Siddiq, the shadow minister for early years, and Jo Stevens, the Shadow Welsh Secretary resigned in protest. On 1 February, forty seven Labour MPs defied Corbyn's whip on the second reading of the bill.

May 2017 local elections
At the 2017 local elections, Labour lost nearly 400 councillors and control of Derbyshire and Nottinghamshire county councils. The BBC's Projected National Vote Share was 38% for the Conservatives, 27% for Labour, 18% for the Liberal Democrats and 5% for UKIP, with others on around 12%.

2017 general election

Corbyn said he welcomed Prime Minister Theresa May's proposal to seek an early general election in 2017. He said his party should support the government's move in the parliamentary vote. The Labour campaign focused on social issues like health care, education and ending austerity.

Earlier in the year, Corbyn had become the first opposition party leader since 1982 to lose a by-election to an incumbent government, and at the time May called the election Labour trailed the Conservative Party by up to 25 points in some opinion polls.  A large Conservative majority was widely predicted. Following the short campaign, Labour again finished as the second largest party in parliament but surprised many pundits by increasing their share of the popular vote to 40%, resulting in a net gain of 30 seats and a hung parliament. Although Labour started the campaign as far as 20 points behind, it defied expectations by gaining 40% of the vote, its greatest share since 2001. It was the first time Labour had made a net gain of seats since 1997, and the party's 9.6% increase in vote share was its largest in a single general election since 1945. This has partly been attributed to the popularity of its 2017 Manifesto that promised to scrap tuition fees, address public sector pay, make housing more affordable, end austerity, nationalise the railways and provide school students with free lunches.

Corbyn's election campaign was run under the slogan "For the Many, Not the Few" and featured rallies with a large audience and connected with a grassroots following for the party, including appearing on stage in front of a crowd of 20,000 at the Wirral Live Festival in Prenton Park. He chose to take part in television debates and dressed more professionally than usual, wearing a business suit and tie. He said the result was a public call for the end of "austerity politics" and suggested May should step down as Prime Minister. Corbyn said that he had received the largest vote for a winning candidate in the history of his borough.

Leaked Labour Party report on antisemitism

In April 2020, an internal Labour Party report, entitled The work of the Labour Party's Governance and Legal Unit in relation to antisemitism, 2014–2019, was leaked to the media. The report was completed in the last months of Corbyn's leadership and was meant to form part of the Labour Party's submission to the Equality and Human Rights Commission (EHRC) inquiry into Labour's approach to dealing with antisemitism. It included 10,000 emails and thousands of private WhatsApp communications between former senior party officials. The Labour Party had, after the intervention of party lawyers, decided not to submit the report to the EHRC.

According to the report there was "an abnormal intensity of factional opposition" to Corbyn which had "inhibited the proper functioning of the Labour Party bureaucracy". The report included what it alleges were examples of how senior Labour Party officials including former party general secretary Iain McNicol worked to undermine Labour's campaign in the 2017 general election in order to force a change of leader. The report revealed that senior party officials sent insulting WhatsApp messages about leftwing MPs, including Diane Abbott, and officials in Corbyn's office. Prior to the 2017 election, officials discussed using party resources to assist candidates critical of Corbyn, such as deputy leader Tom Watson. The report stated that officials operated a "secret key seats team from where a parallel general election campaign was run to support MPs associated with the right wing of the party". The officials expressed dismay over the party's unexpectedly strong results in the 2017 general election. In response to the report, Labour MP Kate Osamor called for the expulsion of those involved. Stephen Bush wrote in the New Statesman that the "report's summary writes a cheque that its findings cannot cash".

In May 2020, the Labour Party National Executive Committee (NEC) appointed barrister Martin Forde to chair an investigation into the leaked report on antisemitism. The inquiry was set up to examine the contents of the report as well as how it was authored and leaked. It was expected to release its findings in 2021, but was delayed indefinitely over concerns it could prejudice an investigation by the information commissioner into the leak, eventually being published in July 2022. In Corbyn's submission to the Forde inquiry, submitted jointly with eight other colleagues, he was reported to have accused officials of sabotage and said their diversion of funds could constitute fraud. The diverted funds refer to the "Bespoke Materials Service" (sometimes referred to as the 'Ergon House Project'), which represented 1.2 per cent of Labour's total election spend and was focused towards certain Labour-held seats rather than offensive targets. BMS was apparently not disclosed to Corbyn's office. Officials said their targeting was due to fears Labour would lose seats, based on its poor polling position at the start of the campaign, and that three of the seats supported by BMS were less than 500 votes away from being lost to the Conservatives. The 2017 campaigns chief, Patrick Heneghan also stated that Corbyn's office had demanded he divert funds towards a list of Labour-held seats, some with majorities of over 10,000, to help MPs were considered allies of Corbyn, including Ian Lavery and Jon Trickett. Heneghan said the use of funds in BMS was legal, as it had been authorised by the General Secretary, and stated it had been kept from Corbyn's office because staffers believed they were "in a bind" and "felt it was pointless to try and discuss this sensibly with Jeremy's staff".

The Guardian reported that "[w]hile the leaked report does show hostility to Corbyn during the 2017 election, and even dismay among some officials when he did better than expected, there is seemingly no proof of active obstruction" by Labour officials and that there was "an argument that any evidence of election-scuppering is circumstantial rather than a smoking gun". In July 2022, the Forde Report concluded that while the leader's office and party staff “were trying to win in different ways”, it was "highly unlikely" this cost Labour the 2017 election (see Publication of Forde Report).

Opinion polling

Opinion polls during the first few months of his leadership gave Corbyn lower personal approval ratings than any previous Labour leader in the early stages of their leadership amongst the general public. His approval amongst party members was initially strong reaching a net approval of +45 in May 2016, though this fell back sharply to just +3 by the end of the next month following criticism of Corbyn's handling of the EU referendum and a string of Shadow Cabinet resignations.

A poll by Election Data in February 2017 found that 50% of Labour voters wanted Corbyn to stand down by the next election, while 44% wanted him to stay. In the same month, YouGov found party members' net approval rating of Corbyn was 17%, whereas a year earlier the result found by the same pollsters had been 55%. Also during February 2017, Ipsos MORI found Corbyn's satisfaction rating among the electorate as a whole was minus 38%; among Labour voters it was minus 9%.

Polling by the end of the first week of campaigning during the 2017 general election was suggesting a defeat for Labour with the parliamentary party much reduced and a landslide victory for the Conservatives with a majority of perhaps 150 MPs. An ITV Wales/YouGov poll at this time placed the Conservatives on 40% in Wales against Labour's 30%; Labour MPs have formed a majority in Wales since the 1922 election. An opinion poll published on 22 May suggested that the position had been reversed, with Labour now polling 44% in Wales and the Conservatives 34%. Polls following the publication of the Labour and Conservative manifestos suggested that nationally, Labour was narrowing the Conservative lead to nine points, with YouGov putting the party on 35% of the vote. The final election polls predicted an increased majority for the Tories.

Second term as Leader of the Opposition (2017–2019)

June 2017 Shadow Cabinet dismissals
Corbyn sacked three Shadow Cabinet members and a fourth resigned after they rebelled against party orders to abstain on a motion aimed at keeping the UK in the EU single market, which was put forward by Labour MP Chuka Umunna.

Salisbury poisoning response
On 15 March 2018, Corbyn wrote in The Guardian that "to rush way ahead of the evidence" about Russia's involvement in the Salisbury poisoning "serves neither justice nor our national security" and that responsibility for the attack "is a matter for police and security professionals to determine". However, he also said that Theresa May was right "to identify two possibilities for the source of the attack in Salisbury [...] Either this was a crime authored by the Russian state; or that state has allowed these deadly toxins to slip out of the control it has an obligation to exercise." This sparked a row within the Labour Party, with more than 30 backbenchers signing an Early Day Motion "unequivocally" blaming Russia for the attack and several frontbenchers, including shadow foreign secretary Emily Thornberry, shadow defence secretary Nia Griffith and shadow Brexit secretary Sir Keir Starmer, stating that Russia was to blame. A poll on 17 March found only 16% of voters believed Corbyn would be the best person to deal with the UK's relations with Russia, compared to 39% saying Theresa May.

On 20 March, Corbyn called for the British authorities to send a sample of the nerve agent involved in the poisoning to Russia, so they could "say categorically one way or the other" where it came from. A few days later, Corbyn was satisfied that the evidence pointed to Russia. Polling between 10–13 April found only 23% of voters believed Corbyn had handled the situation well, with 44% (including 28% of 2017 Labour voters) believing he had handled it badly.

Corbyn advisor Andrew Murray later said that the Salisbury attack was "something we got wrong", saying "evidence that's emerged since is overwhelming". Murray said that at the time Corbyn and his team "just didn't think the Russian state would be so stupid and brazen as to [...] carry out a poisoning attack on British soil", although he admitted "given the Litvinenko precedent perhaps we should have done". Murray also suggested the response was the turning point for Corbyn's leadership, as it "started bringing all the doubts about Jeremy and the leader's office to the surface again".

Developments of the Labour Party's Brexit policies
Following the 2017 general election, the party faced internal pressure to shift its Brexit policy away from a soft Brexit and towards a second referendum, a position widely supported among the party membership. In response, Corbyn said at the 2018 Labour Party conference that he did not support a second referendum but would abide by the decision of members at the conference. The party conference decided to support a Brexit deal either negotiated by the Conservatives and meeting certain conditions or negotiated by Labour in government. The conference agreed to use all means to stop an unacceptable Brexit deal, including another referendum including an option to remain in the EU, as a last resort. A week after seven Labour MPs left the party in February 2019 to form The Independent Group, partly in protest over Labour's Brexit position, the Labour leadership said it would support another referendum "as a final resort in order to stop a damaging Tory Brexit being forced on the country". Following an exodus of Remain voters from Labour at the 2019 Europeans Parliament elections, Corbyn said he was "listening very carefully" after key members of his Shadow Cabinet including John McDonnell said publicly Labour should back a second referendum under any circumstances. In July 2019, Corbyn announced Labour's policy was now that there must be a referendum on any Brexit deal, including the deal Labour would attempt to negotiate if it entered government, and that the party would campaign for Remain against any Tory Brexit. During the 2019 election Corbyn would promise to take a "neutral stance" during the referendum on any Brexit deal his government would negotiate.

Breakaway group of Labour MPs
In February 2019, seven MPs – Chuka Umunna, Luciana Berger, Chris Leslie, Angela Smith, Mike Gapes, Gavin Shuker and Ann Coffey – resigned from the Labour Party to form The Independent Group, citing Corbyn's handling of Brexit and of allegations of antisemitism. They were soon joined by Joan Ryan while Ian Austin resigned to sit as an independent. TIG later rebranded as Change UK, and all of the defecting MPs left Parliament at the 2019 general election, with some losing their seats, others not seeking re-election, and some standing and losing in different constituencies from the ones that they had previously held.

Other events
In 2018, Conservative MP Ben Bradley posted a tweet saying that Jeremy Corbyn had passed British secrets to a spy from communist Czechoslovakia. Corbyn threatened legal action against Bradley, which resulted in Bradley deleting the tweet, apologising for his comments which he accepted were "untrue and false", and agreeing to pay Corbyn's legal costs and to donate to a charity of Corbyn's choice.

In March 2019, Corbyn was assaulted by a Brexit supporter outside a mosque in Finsbury Park, North London. His attacker was sentenced to 28 days in jail.

A video of soldiers from the 3rd Battalion, Parachute Regiment, stationed in Afghanistan using an image of Corbyn for target practice was posted on social media in April 2019. Momentum said the video was a consequence of the "radicalising effect the rightwing press". The Independent expressed the view that Corbyn was "unpopular in parts of the military because of his past policies on Northern Ireland, Trident and opposition to the Iraq War and other foreign interventions". In July 2019, the soldiers involved received reprimands, with two being demoted.

In 2019, Corbyn refused an invitation to attend a state banquet for Donald Trump, hosted by Queen Elizabeth II during the president's June visit to the UK. Corbyn then attended a London protest outside Trump and May's joint press conference and requested a meeting with Trump to discuss issues such as the "climate emergency, threats to peace and the refugee crisis". Trump rejected the request, saying that Corbyn was a "negative force".

2019 general election and resignation

In May 2019, Theresa May announced her resignation and stood down as Prime Minister in July, following the election of her replacement, former Foreign Secretary Boris Johnson. Corbyn said that Labour was ready to fight an election against Johnson.

The 2019 Labour Party Manifesto included policies to increase funding for health, negotiate a Brexit deal and hold a referendum giving a choice between the deal and remain, raise the minimum wage, stop the age pension age increase, nationalise key industries, and replace universal credit. Due to the plans to nationalise the "big six" energy firms, the National Grid, the water industry, Royal Mail, the railways and the broadband arm of BT, the 2019 manifesto was widely considered as the most radical in several decades, more closely resembling Labour's politics of the 1970s than subsequent decades.

The 2019 general election was the worst defeat in seats for Labour since 1935, with Labour winning just 202 out of 650 seats, their fourth successive election defeat. At 32.2%, Labour's share of the vote was down around eight points on the 2017 general election and is lower than that achieved by Neil Kinnock in 1992, although it was higher than in 2010 and 2015. In the aftermath, opinions differed to why the Labour Party was defeated to the extent it was. The Shadow Chancellor John McDonnell largely blamed Brexit and the media representation of the party. Tony Blair argued that the party's unclear position on Brexit and the economic policy pursued by the Corbyn leadership were to blame.

Following the Labour Party's unsuccessful performance in the 2019 general election, Corbyn conceded defeat and stated that he intended to step down as leader following the election of a successor and that he would not lead the party into the next election. Corbyn himself was re-elected for Islington North with 64.3% of the vote share and a majority of 26,188 votes over the runner-up candidate representing the Liberal Democrats, with Labour's share of the vote falling by 8.7%. The Guardian described the results as a "realignment" of UK politics as the Conservative landslide took many traditionally Labour seats in England and Wales. Corbyn insisted that he had "pride in the manifesto" that Labour put forward and blamed the defeat on Brexit. According to polling by Lord Ashcroft, Corbyn was himself a major contribution to the party's defeat.

On 4 April 2020, the results of the 2020 Labour Party leadership election were announced, with Sir Keir Starmer winning the election and succeeding Corbyn as the leader of the Labour Party.

Opinion polling 
In the months following the 2017 election, Labour consistently had a small lead in opinion polling. After Boris Johnson became Prime Minister in July 2019, he gained double-digit leads over Corbyn on the "Best PM" question, although Corbyn was seen to be "more in touch" with ordinary people than Johnson. Labour fell behind the Tories, partly because it lost some of its pro-Remain support to the Liberal Democrats.

Post-leadership

EHRC report and suspension 
On 29 October 2020, a report by the Equalities and Human Rights Commission into anti-Semitism in the Labour party was published, finding that the party was responsible for unlawful acts of harassment and discrimination. Corbyn said in his statement on the report that while anti-Semitism was "absolutely abhorrent" and that  "one anti-Semite [in the Labour Party] is one too many”, he alleged that “the scale of the problem was also dramatically overstated for political reasons by our opponents inside and outside the party, as well as by much of the media”. In his press conference around half an hour later, Starmer said that anyone who thought the problems were "exaggerated" or were a "factional attack" were "part of the problem and... should be nowhere near the Labour Party". Corbyn defended his comments in a TV interview later that day; shortly after it aired, the Labour Party announced that it had suspended Corbyn pending an investigation.

On 17 November 2020, a panel drawn from the party's national executive committee decided to readmit Corbyn to the Labour Party. However, Starmer did not restore the Labour whip to Corbyn, effectively denying him readmission to the parliamentary party, saying that he would "keep this situation under review". On 23 November 2020, the Labour chief whip Nick Brown wrote to Corbyn asking him to "unequivocally, unambiguously and without reservation apologise for your comments". In November 2021, Starmer said Corbyn "knows what he must do in order to move this forward" and that it was "his choice". He also stated that Corbyn might not be allowed to stand as a Labour candidate in Islington North unless the whip was restored. Corbyn believes his dismissal was unfair and has threatened legal action.

Peace and Justice Project

On 13 December 2020, Corbyn announced the Project for Peace and Justice. Corbyn launched the project on 17 January 2021, and its affiliates include Christine Blower, Len McCluskey and Zarah Sultana. Rafael Correa said that he "welcome[d] the creation" of the project.

Stop the War Coalition statement on Ukraine crisis

On 18 February 2022, in the week before the Russian invasion of Ukraine, Corbyn alongside 11 Labour MPs cosigned a statement from the Stop the War Coalition opposing any war in Ukraine. The statement said that "the crisis should be settled on a basis which recognises the right of the Ukrainian people to self-determination and addresses Russia's security concerns", that NATO "should call a halt to its eastward expansion", and that the British government's sending of arms to Ukraine and troops to eastern Europe served "no purpose other than inflaming tensions and indicating disdain for Russian concerns". The statement's authors also said that they "refute [sic] the idea that NATO is a defensive alliance".

On the evening of 24 February, the first day of the invasion, Labour chief whip Alan Campbell wrote to all 11 Labour MPs who had signed the statement, requesting that they withdraw their signatures. All 11 agreed to do so the same evening. Corbyn and fellow former Labour independent MP Claudia Webbe did not withdraw their signatures from the statement, though Labour shadow foreign secretary David Lammy urged Corbyn to do so.

Publication of the Forde Report
The Forde Report, written by lawyer Martin Forde in response to the dossier that was leaked in April 2020 (The work of the Labour Party's Governance and Legal Unit in relation to antisemitism, 2014–2019), was released on 19 July 2022, stating that: "[R]ather than confront the paramount need to deal with the profoundly serious issue of anti-Semitism in the party, both factions treated it as a factional weapon." It also described senior Labour staff as having displayed "deplorably factional and insensitive, and at times discriminatory, attitudes" towards Corbyn and his supporters, and detailed concerns by some staff about a "hierarchy of racism" in the party which ignored Black people. The report also expressed regret that Corbyn himself did not engage with the authors' request to interview him.

Responding to this, Corbyn's former advisor Andrew Fisher wrote: "Forde confirms that reflection is necessary. Cultural change requires painstaking work, not glib assertions of change." Corbyn himself stated that report "calls into question the behaviour of senior officials in the party, in particular during the 2017 election" and that "wrongs must be righted."

Policies and views

In 1997 the political scientists David Butler and Dennis Kavanagh described Corbyn's political stance as "far-left".

When asked in an interview in 2015 what politicised him Corbyn said, "Peace issues. Vietnam. Environmental issues". When asked if he regarded himself as a Marxist, Corbyn responded by saying: "That is a very interesting question actually. I haven't thought about that for a long time. I haven't really read as much of Marx as we should have done. I have read quite a bit but not that much." Supporting John McDonnell's statement that there is "a lot to learn" from Karl Marx's book Das Kapital, Corbyn described Marx as a "great economist". Corbyn has said he has read some of the works of Adam Smith, Karl Marx and David Ricardo and has "looked at many, many others".

Economy and taxation
Corbyn has campaigned against private finance initiative schemes, supported a higher rate of income tax for the wealthiest in society, and his shadow chancellor proposed the introduction of a £10 per hour living wage. He advocates recouping losses from tax avoidance and evasion by investing £1 billion in HM Revenue and Customs. Corbyn sought to reduce an estimated £93 billion that companies receive in tax relief. The amount is made up of several reliefs, including railway and energy subsidies, regional development grants, relief on investment and government procurement from the private sector.
 	
Corbyn opposes austerity, and has advocated an economic strategy based on investing-to-grow as opposed to making spending cuts. During his first Labour leadership election campaign, Corbyn proposed that the Bank of England should be able to issue money for capital spending, especially housebuilding, instead of quantitative easing, which attempts to stimulate the economy by buying assets from commercial banks. He describes it as "People's Quantitative Easing". A number of economists, including Steve Keen, said that Corbyn's candidature for leadership of the Labour party "recognis[ed] the inspiring possibilities for a fairer and more equal society offered by an information economy in an interdependent world". Robert Skidelsky offered a qualified endorsement of Corbyn's proposals to carry out QE through a National Investment Bank. As the policy would change the central bank's focus on stabilising prices it has been argued it could increase the perceived risk of investing in the UK and raise the prospect of increased inflation. His second leadership campaign saw him promise £500 billion in additional public spending, though he did not detail how he would fund it.

Corbyn has been a consistent supporter of renationalising public utilities, such as the now-privatised British Rail and energy companies, back into public ownership. Initially, Corbyn suggested completely renationalising the entire railway network, but would now bring them under public control "line by line" as franchises expire.

National and constitutional issues
Corbyn is a longstanding supporter of a united Ireland and reportedly described himself as campaigner against imperialism in Ireland in 1984. In 1985, Corbyn voted against the Anglo-Irish Agreement, saying that it strengthened the border between Northern Ireland and the Republic of Ireland and he opposed it as he wished to see a united Ireland. In July 1998, Corbyn endorsed the Good Friday Agreement by voting for the Northern Ireland Bill saying: "We look forward to peace, hope and reconciliation in Ireland in the future."

Corbyn would prefer Britain to become a republic, but has said that, given the Royal Family's popularity, "it's not a battle that I am fighting".

On the issue of Scottish independence, when asked if he would consider himself a unionist, Corbyn said: "No, I would describe myself as a Socialist. I would prefer the UK to stay together, yes, but I recognise the right of people to take the decision on their own autonomy and independence." Corbyn said that he did not favour holding a second Scottish independence referendum, but that it would be wrong for the UK Parliament to block such a referendum if the Scottish Parliament desired to have one.

As Leader of the Opposition, Corbyn was one of the sponsors for the Constitutional Convention Bill, which was an attempt at codifying the UK's constitution, which has not been compiled into a single document. He appointed a Shadow Minister for the Constitutional Convention into his Shadow Cabinet and Teresa Pearce stepped down after the May 2017 local elections and this position has since remained vacant.

In October 2017, Corbyn was one of 113 MPs to sign a cross-party petition to Home Secretary Amber Rudd, which requested making it a criminal offence for opponents of abortion to hold protests outside of abortion clinics. The letter called for buffer zones to be established around clinics, arguing women "face daily abuse when undergoing terminations", with protesters instead given space in town centres or Speakers’ corner. He also promised to allow abortion in Northern Ireland as well as same-sex marriage.

Education
During the 2015 Labour leadership contest, Corbyn put forward a policy to scrap all tuition fees and restore student maintenance grants. The cost of the policy was estimated at £10 billion which would be funded by "a 7% rise in national insurance for those earning over £50,000 a year and a 2.5% higher corporation tax, or by slowing the pace at which the deficit is reduced". Corbyn apologised for the actions of previous Labour governments in imposing "fees, top-up fees and the replacement of grants with loans". He said "I opposed those changes at the time – as did many others – and now we have an opportunity to change course".

During the 2017 election, Corbyn had a policy of scrapping university tuition fees from 2018 restoring the maintenance grants abolished by the Conservatives in 2016 and funding a free national education service. He also pledged to investigate cancelling student loan debts incurred by recent graduates. The policy said that the British average student starts their working life with debts of £44,000 due to tuition costs and that university tuition is free in many northern European countries. The education changes were costed at £9.5 billion and would be funded by increasing taxes on the top 5 per cent of earners and increasing corporations tax.

European Union
Corbyn has previously been a left-wing Eurosceptic. In the 1975 European Communities referendum, Corbyn opposed Britain's membership of the European Communities, the precursor of the EU. Corbyn also opposed the ratification of the Maastricht Treaty in 1993, opposed the Lisbon Treaty in 2008, and backed a proposed referendum on British withdrawal from the EU in 2011. He accused the EU of acting "brutally" in the 2015 Greek crisis by allowing financiers to destroy its economy.

During his leadership campaign, Corbyn said there might be circumstances in which he would favour withdrawal from the EU. In September 2015, Corbyn said that Labour would campaign for Britain to stay in the EU regardless of the result of Cameron's negotiations, and instead "pledge to reverse any changes" if Cameron reduced the rights of workers or citizens. He also believed that Britain should play a crucial role in Europe by making demands about working arrangements across the continent, the levels of corporation taxation and in forming an agreement on environmental regulation.

In June 2016, in the run-up to the EU referendum, Corbyn said that there was an "overwhelming case" for staying in the EU. In a speech in London, Corbyn said: "We, the Labour Party, are overwhelmingly for staying in, because we believe the European Union has brought investment, jobs and protection for workers, consumers and the environment." Corbyn also criticised media coverage and warnings from both sides, saying that the debate had been dominated too much by "myth-making and prophecies of doom". He said he was "seven, or seven and a half" out of 10 for staying in the EU.

In July 2017, Corbyn said that Britain could not remain in the European Single Market after leaving the EU, saying that membership of the single market was "dependent on membership of the EU", although it includes some non-EU countries. Shadow Minister Barry Gardiner later suggested that Corbyn meant that Labour interpreted the referendum result as wanting to leave the single market. Corbyn said that Labour would campaign for an alternative arrangement involving "tariff free access". In October 2017, Corbyn said that he would vote remain if there were another referendum.

In January 2018, Corbyn reiterated that Labour would not seek to keep the UK in the single market after Brexit and in June 2018 he called for a "new single market" deal for the UK after Brexit maintaining "full access" to the EU internal market, as opposed to the "Norway model" which pro-Remainers in the party wish to see.

In 2018, Corbyn said his main reason for not committing to remaining in the single market was freedom from EU rules on state aid to industry. He said the UK government should not be "held back, inside or outside the EU, from taking the steps we need to support cutting edge industries and local business". This prompted backlash from senior EU figures, who said that state subsidisation would be a "red line" in negotiations, as it would lead to a possible trade war between the UK and EU. One senior figure told The Times: "We have to protect ourselves and the single market ... If a Corbyn government implements his declared policies the level playing field mechanism will lead to increased costs for Britain to access the single market because of distortions caused by state aid."

Also in 2018, Corbyn said he would seek a new type of customs union with the European Union, but will seek exemptions of some EU regulations for the UK, such as those regarding state aid and government subsidies.

In January 2019, Labour lost a vote of no confidence in the government. The Conservative government sought to open cross-party talks while Corbyn initially said Labour would refuse to attend talks unless the government ruled out a "no deal Brexit". In March 2019, Corbyn said that he could vote leave in a second referendum, depending on the Brexit deal on offer.

Following the 2019 European Parliament election, Corbyn endorsed holding a referendum on the Brexit withdrawal agreement regardless of who negotiates it.

Foreign affairs

War and peace

During the 1982 Falklands War, in a meeting of Haringey Council, Corbyn opposed a motion offering support to British troops sent to retake the islands, instead declaring the war to be a "Tory plot" and submitted an alternative motion that condemned the war as a "nauseating waste of lives and money". Corbyn has said that he would like Britain to achieve "some reasonable accommodation" with Argentina over their Falkland Islands dispute, with a "degree of joint administration" between the two countries over the islands.

Corbyn does not consider himself an absolute pacifist and has named the Spanish Civil War, the British naval blockade to stop the slave trade in the nineteenth century and the role of UN peacekeepers in the 1999 crisis in East Timor as justified conflicts.  Opposing violence and war has been "the whole purpose of his life".  He prominently opposed the invasion of Iraq and War in Afghanistan, NATO-led military intervention in Libya, military strikes against Assad's Syria, and military action against ISIS, and served as the chair of the Stop the War Coalition.  When challenged on whether there were any circumstances in which he would deploy military forces overseas he said "I'm sure there are some but I can't think of them at the moment."

Corbyn has called for Tony Blair to be investigated for alleged war crimes during the Iraq War.  In July 2016, the Chilcot Report of the Iraq Inquiry was issued, criticising Blair for joining the United States in the war against Iraq.  Subsequently, Corbyn  – who had voted against military action against Iraq – gave a speech in Westminster commenting: "I now apologise sincerely on behalf of my party for the disastrous decision to go to war in Iraq in March 2003" which he called an "act of military aggression launched on a false pretext" something that has "long been regarded as illegal by the overwhelming weight of international opinion".  Corbyn specifically apologised to "the people of Iraq"; to the families of British soldiers who died in Iraq or returned injured; and to "the millions of British citizens who feel our democracy was traduced and undermined by the way in which the decision to go to war was taken on."

Corbyn has said he would prefer to use diplomacy rather than armed force in international conflict.  He would avoid military conflict by "building up the diplomatic relationships and also trying to not isolate any country in Europe".  His aim is to "achieve a world where we don't need to go to war, where there is no need for it".

NATO 
Corbyn favours the United Kingdom leaving NATO, and for NATO to be disbanded. In May 2012, Corbyn authored a piece in the Morning Star titled "High time for an end to NATO" where he described the organisation as an "instrument of cold war manipulation", saying that "The collapse of the Soviet Union in 1990, with the ending of the Warsaw Pact mutual defence strategy, was the obvious time for NATO to have been disbanded." and also said a 2014 speech that the organisation was an "engine for the delivery of oil to the oil companies" and called for it to "give up, go home and go away".

For these comments and a refusal to answer whether he would defend a NATO ally in the case of attack he was criticised by Anders Fogh Rasmussen, the former Prime Minister of Denmark and NATO Secretary General, who said Corbyn's opinions were "tempting President Putin to aggression" and made comparisons between his views and those of the American president Donald Trump. He was also criticised by George Robertson, former Labour Party defence secretary, who said "It beggars belief that the leader of the party most responsible for the collective security pact of NATO should be so reckless as to undermine it by refusing to say he would come to the aid of an ally".

He has since acknowledged that the British public do not agree with his beliefs that the UK should leave NATO, and instead intends to push for the organisation to "restrict its role". He believes there should be a debate about the extent of NATO's powers including its "democratic accountability" and why it has taken on a global role. In April 2014, Corbyn wrote an article for the Morning Star attributing the crisis in Ukraine to NATO. He said the "root of the crisis" lay in "the US drive to expand eastwards" and described Russia's actions as "not unprovoked". He has said it "probably was" a mistake to allow former Warsaw Pact countries to join NATO as it has increased tensions with Russia and made the "world infinitely more dangerous". Subsequently, he criticized the British government and other Western countries for supplying arms to Ukraine.

During the 2017 election, when questioned about Corbyn's anti-NATO statements, Labour Shadow Foreign Secretary Emily Thornberry said, "Jeremy has been on a journey, to coin a phrase. There have been a number of discussions. It is quite clear that the predominance of opinion within the Labour is that we are committed to NATO."

Nuclear weapons 
Corbyn is a longstanding supporter of unilateral nuclear disarmament, although he has suggested a compromise of having submarines without nuclear weapons. He has campaigned for many years against nuclear weapons and the replacement of Trident and has said he would not authorise the use of nuclear weapons if he were prime minister. In June 2016, he agreed to allow Labour MPs a free vote on the replacement of Trident. In the subsequent vote 140 Labour MPs voted with the government in favour of the new submarines, in line with party policy, and 47 joined Corbyn to vote against. During the debate Corbyn said "I do not believe the threat of mass murder is a legitimate way to deal with international relations".

United States

Following the election of Donald Trump in the 2016 US presidential elections, Corbyn said that he believes that President Trump is not offering solutions to problems, but simply being divisive. Corbyn also called for a proposed Trump state visit to the UK to be cancelled following his executive order banning visitors from certain majority-Muslim countries from entering the US.

Corbyn criticised Trump's involvement in British politics after Trump said Boris Johnson should become PM and Nigel Farage should be part of the Brexit negotiating team, saying that it was "not [Trump's] business who the British prime minister is" following Trump's endorsement of Boris Johnson as a possible future leader. Corbyn criticised Trump's attacks on Sadiq Khan as "unacceptable".

Israel and Palestine
Corbyn is a member of the Palestine Solidarity Campaign, campaigning, for example, against the killing of Palestinian civilians during conflict in Gaza. In 2012 and again in 2017, Corbyn called for an investigation into Israeli influence in British politics. In August 2016, Corbyn said: "I am not in favour of the academic or cultural boycott of Israel, and I am not in favour of a blanket boycott of Israeli goods. I do support targeted boycotts aimed at undermining the existence of illegal settlements in the West Bank."

At a meeting hosted by Stop the War Coalition in 2009, Corbyn said he invited "friends" from Hamas and Hezbollah to an event in parliament, referred to Hamas as "an organisation dedicated towards the good of the Palestinian people," and said that the British government's labelling of Hamas as a terrorist organisation is "a big, big historical mistake." Asked on Channel 4 News in July 2015 why he had called representatives from Hamas and Hezbollah "friends", Corbyn explained, "I use it in a collective way, saying our friends are prepared to talk," and that the specific occasion he used it was to introduce speakers from Hezbollah at a Parliamentary meeting about the Middle East. He said that he does not condone the actions of either organisation: "Does it mean I agree with Hamas and what it does? No. Does it mean I agree with Hezbollah and what they do? No. What it means is that I think to bring about a peace process, you have to talk to people with whom you may profoundly disagree … There is not going to be a peace process unless there is talks involving Israel, Hezbollah and Hamas and I think everyone knows that", he argued.

In January 2017, Corbyn expressed concern about Israeli involvement in British politics, after the broadcasting of The Lobby. He described the actions of the Israeli official, Shai Masot, as "improper interference in this country's democratic process" and was concerned on national security grounds that Boris Johnson had said the matter was closed.

In his keynote speech at the 2018 annual Labour Party conference, Corbyn said that, if elected, his government would immediately recognise the Palestinian State as a way of supporting a two-state solution to the Israeli-Palestinian conflict. He declared that the Labour Party condemned the "shooting of hundreds of unarmed demonstrators in Gaza by Israeli forces and the passing of Israel's discriminatory nation-state law".

In May 2019, Corbyn sent a message of support to the National Demonstration for Palestine in London in which Ahed Tamimi participated. He said the Labour Party condemned the "ongoing human rights abuses by Israeli forces, including the shooting by Israeli forces of hundreds of unarmed Palestinian demonstrators in Gaza – most of them refugees or families of refugees – demanding their rights".

Tunisian wreath-laying controversy 

In October 2014, Corbyn visited Tunisia to attend the "International Conference on Monitoring the Palestinian Political and Legal Situation in the Light of Israeli Aggression", organised by the Centre for Strategic Studies for North Africa. While there, Corbyn and other British parliamentarians attended a commemoration for victims of the 1985 Israeli air strikes on the PLO headquarters in Tunis. The bombardment had been condemned by British Prime Minister Margaret Thatcher and US President Ronald Reagan, as well as the UN Security Council.

In August 2018, the Daily Mail reported, with pictorial evidence, that during the event, Corbyn had also been present at a wreath-laying at the graves of Salah Khalaf and Atef Bseiso, both of whom are thought to have been key members of the Black September Organization, which was behind the 1972 Munich massacre. The Jerusalem Post commented: "In another photo, Corbyn is seen close to the grave of terrorist Atef Bseiso, intelligence chief of the Palestine Liberation Organization. Bseiso is also linked to the massacre." There was condemnation from some of the British press, as well as from some members of the Labour Party and Israeli Prime Minister Benjamin Netanyahu. A Labour spokesperson said that "a wreath was laid on behalf of those at the conference to all those who lost their lives, including families and children".

On 1 August, BBC News showed in a report from inside the cemetery that for the memorial for the 1985 victims, Corbyn would have stood in a designated confined covered area where all dignitaries typically stand during annual ceremonies, which also covers the graves of Bseiso and Khalaf. Corbyn said that he had been present during commemorations where a wreath was laid for Palestinian leaders linked to Black September, but did not think that he had actually been involved.  A Labour spokesperson stated that Corbyn "did not lay any wreath at the graves of those alleged to have been linked to the Black September Organisation or the 1972 Munich killings. He of course condemns that terrible attack, as he does the 1985 bombing." The Labour Party initially made a complaint to the press watchdog Independent Press Standards Organisation against several newspapers' alleged misreporting of the event, although this was later dropped.

Kosovo
Unlike most Labour MPs at the time, Corbyn and a few other backbenchers opposed NATO intervention during the Kosovo War. In 2004, Corbyn and 24 other backbenchers signed a parliamentary motion praising an article by journalist John Pilger for "reminding readers of the devastating human cost of the so-termed ‘humanitarian’ invasion of Kosovo, led by NATO and the United States in the Spring of 1999, without any sanction of the United Nations Security Council". The motion also congratulated Pilger "on his expose of the fraudulent justifications for intervening in a ‘genocide’ that never really existed in Kosovo". The motion said that initial estimates of casualties by the US Ambassador for War Crimes Issues were much higher than the later body count by the International War Crimes Tribunal. Balkan Insight wrote that, during the 2015 campaign for the Labour leadership, Corbyn was criticised by bloggers and journalists for "having once apparently dismissed Serbian war crimes in Kosovo as a fabrication".

Sri Lanka and the Tamil Tigers 
In 2006, Corbyn signed a petition calling for the lifting of the ban on the Tamil Tigers, which it referred to as the "supposedly terrorist Tamil Tigers", stating that "the Sri Lanka government is carrying out an undeclared war against the Tamil people who have been struggling for more than two decades for the legitimate right to self-rule" and calling for an end to aerial bombardment by the Sri Lankan government. In 2009, Corbyn called for a total economic boycott of Sri Lanka, stating "the tourism must stop, the arms must stop, the trade must stop", he later stated the Sri Lankan cricket team should also be boycotted. He expressed outrage particularly at the reports of the depopulation of Tamil areas of Eastern Sri Lanka and the relocation of Tamils, stating that denying Tamils the right to return home was in contravention of international law, as well as reports of systematic sexual violence.

In 2016, after Corbyn released a video stating his "solidarity to stand with the Tamil community in the search for truth, justice, accountability and reconciliation", while the Labour Party reiterated its " full implementation of the UN Human Rights Councils resolution on Sri Lanka", some Tamil activists interpreted the video to be a signal of Jeremy Corbyn's "support for Tamil self-determination". In 2017, John McDonnell stated that a Corbyn led Labour government would end arms sales to Sri Lanka.

Iran
Corbyn has called for the lifting of the sanctions on Iran as part of a negotiated full settlement of issues concerning the Iranian nuclear programme, and the starting of a political process to decommission Israel's nuclear arsenal.

Saudi Arabia
Corbyn has criticised Britain's close ties with Saudi Arabia and British involvement in the Saudi Arabian-led intervention in Yemen. In January 2016, after a United Nations panel ruled Saudi-led bombing campaign of Yemen contravened international humanitarian law, Corbyn called for an independent inquiry into the UK's arms exports policy to Saudi Arabia. Corbyn and Hilary Benn wrote to David Cameron asking him to "set out the exact nature of the involvement of UK personnel working with the Saudi military". Corbyn has constantly called for the British Government to stop selling arms to Saudi Arabia to show that Britain wants a peace process in Yemen, "not an invasion by Saudi Arabia". In March 2018, Corbyn accused Theresa May's government of "colluding" in war crimes committed by Saudi forces in Yemen. He said that a "humanitarian disaster is now taking place in Yemen. Millions face starvation...because of the Saudi led bombing campaign and the blockade."

Corbyn called for the suspension of arms sales to Saudi Arabia after dissident Saudi journalist Jamal Khashoggi was murdered inside the Saudi consulate in Istanbul. Corbyn also called for an international investigation into the assassination of Jamal Khashoggi and Saudi's war crimes in Yemen.

Chagos Islands sovereignty dispute
The sovereignty of the Chagos Archipelago in the Indian Ocean is disputed between the United Kingdom and Mauritius. Corbyn said he would respect a UN vote calling on the UK to decolonise the Chagos Archipelago and return Chagos to Mauritius. He said that "What happened to the Chagos islanders was utterly disgraceful. [They were] forcibly removed from their own islands, unfortunately, by this country. The right of return to those islands is absolutely important as a symbol of the way in which we wish to behave in international law."

Cuba
Corbyn is a longtime supporter of the Cuba Solidarity Campaign, which campaigns against the US embargo against Cuba and supports the Cuban Revolution. In November 2016, following the death of former communist President of Cuba Fidel Castro, While saying that Castro had "flaws" and was a "huge figure of modern history, national independence and 20th Century socialism...Castro's achievements were many", Corbyn also praised his revolutionary "heroism". Internal Labour party critics of Corbyn accused him of glossing over Castro's human rights abuses.

Venezuela
When Hugo Chávez, the socialist President of Venezuela died in 2013, Corbyn tweeted that "Hugo Chavez showed that the poor matter and wealth can be shared. He made massive contributions to Venezuela & a very wide world". In 2014, Corbyn congratulated Chávez's successor, President Nicolás Maduro on his election to the presidency. In February 2019, he said that "intervention in Venezuela and sanctions against the government of Nicolás Maduro were wrong" and that "only Venezuelans have the right to decide their own destiny". He was against outside interference in Venezuela, "whether from the US or anywhere else". He said there "needed to be dialogue and a negotiated settlement to overcome the crisis".

Kurdistan and Kurds 
In 1988, Jeremy Corbyn was one of the first MPs to raise the issue of Saddam Hussein's Halabja chemical attack against the Kurdish people, at a time when Hussein was still an ally of the west. In the aftermath, he called upon the Tory government to institute sanctions against Iraq and Iran to end the Iran–Iraq War, and to end the use of chemical weapons against the Kurds.

In 2016, Corbyn said that "if peace is wanted in the region, the Kurdish people's right to self-determination must be accepted." Referring to the Kurdish nationalist leader Abdullah Öcalan, he remarked "if there will be a peace process and solution, Öcalan must be free and at the table."

At Chatham House in 2017 he was asked if he would "condemn the genocide which is going on against the Kurds in Syria and in Turkey," Corbyn responded with "I would be very strong with the Turkish government on its treatment of Kurdish people and minorities and the way in which it's denied them their decency and human rights." On warfare by Turkey against the Kurds, Corbyn stated, "If arms are being used to oppress people internally in violation of international law then they simply should not be supplied to them."

Allegations of antisemitism

Corbyn's critics, including British Orthodox rabbi Jonathan Sacks, former Chief Rabbi of the United Hebrew Congregations of the Commonwealth, have accused him of antisemitism in relation to past associations and comments as well as his handling of allegations within the party while defenders have cited his support for Jews against racism. These associations included hosting a meeting where Holocaust survivor and anti-Zionist political activist Hajo Meyer compared Israeli actions in Gaza to elements of the Holocaust; Corbyn stated of this event, "In the past, in pursuit of justice for the Palestinian people and peace in Israel/Palestine, I have on occasion appeared on platforms with people whose views I completely reject. I apologise for the concerns and anxiety that this has caused.” Corbyn attended "two or three" of the annual Deir Yassin Remembered commemorations in London, with Jewish fellow Labour MP Gerald Kaufman, organised by a group founded by Paul Eisen, who has denied the Holocaust, but it is not known whether Eisen attended the commemorations. Corbyn stated that he was unaware of the views expressed by Eisen, and had associated with Mayer and others with whom he disagreed in pursuit of progress in the Middle East. Eisen had written an essay on his website in 2008 entitled "My life as a Holocaust denier".

Corbyn has been criticized for his association with cleric Raed Salah, who was arrested in 2011 due to a deportation order a day before he was due to attend a meeting with MPs including Corbyn. Salah was accused of speaking of 'blood libel' (the myth that Jews in Europe had used children's blood in making holy bread) and had said after the 9/11 attacks, that 4,000 "Jewish clerks" had been absent on the day of the attacks. Salah denied the accusation of blood libel, of which he was later convicted and sentenced to eight months in prison, and successfully appealed his deportation. Corbyn said that Salah was "a voice of the Palestinian people that needs to be heard" and accused then-Home Secretary Theresa May of giving "an executive detention order against him". Following Salah's successful appeal against deportation, Corbyn said he was looking forward to inviting the cleric to "tea on the House of Commons terrace, because you deserve it". A Labour source also stated in response, "Jeremy Corbyn is a determined supporter of justice for the Palestinian people and opponent of anti-Semitism. He condemns support for Palestinians being used as a mask for anti-Semitism and attempts to silence legitimate criticism of Israel by wrongly conflating it with anti-Semitism. There was widespread criticism of the attempt to deport Raed Salah, including from Jews for Justice for Palestinians, and his appeal against deportation succeeded on all grounds."

In 2018, Corbyn was criticised by Jewish leaders for not recognising an antisemitic canard after Mear One publicised on social media in 2012 that his mural about exploitative bankers and industrialists was being censored and Corbyn responded at the time by questioning its removal. In response to the criticism, Corbyn said he regretted that he "did not look more closely at the image", agreed it was antisemitic and endorsed the decision to remove it. In 2020, the Equality and Human Rights Commission (EHRC) revealed that an antisemitism complaint had been made against Corbyn in April 2018 over his defence of the mural, and members of Corbyn's office "directly interfered in the decision not to investigate the case,” an example of political interference the EHRC concluded was "unlawful". Corbyn was criticised for a 2013 speech in which he spoke of certain Zionists who had "berated" the Palestinian speaker at a meeting, "they don't want to study history and secondly having lived in this country for a very long time, probably all their lives, they don't understand English irony either" (used by the speaker). The remarks were criticised for appearing to perpetuate the antisemitic canard that Jews fail or refuse to integrate into wider society. Corbyn responded that he was using Zionist "in the accurate political sense and not as a euphemism for Jewish people". Jonathan Sacks, a former Chief Rabbi, described the remark as "the most offensive statement made by a senior British politician since Enoch Powell's 1968 ‘rivers of blood’ speech."

In 2019, Corbyn was criticised for a foreword he wrote in 2011 for a republication of the 1902 book Imperialism: A Study by John A. Hobson, as the book contains the antisemitic assertion that finance was controlled "by men of a single and peculiar race, who have behind them many centuries of financial experience" who "are in a unique position to control the policy of nations". In his foreword, he called the book a "great tome" and "brilliant, and very controversial at the time". Corbyn responded that the language used to describe minorities in Hobson's work is "absolutely deplorable", but he stated that his foreword analysed "the process which led to the first world war" which he saw as the subject of the book and not Hobson's language.

In July 2018 Corbyn was accosted by Labour MP Margaret Hodge in the Commons; she then told him she believed he was “an antisemitic racist” because of his perceived reluctance to adopt the International Holocaust Remembrance Alliance's definition of antisemitism in full. In an opinion piece for The Guardian, Hodge explained that, for her, as the daughter of Holocaust survivors, the issue of racism was personal. The party began disciplinary action against Hodge but dropped the charges in August, claiming she had  "expressed regret for the manner in which she raised her views", but Hodge denied this was the case.

Following coverage of alleged antisemitic statements by party members, Corbyn commissioned the Chakrabarti Inquiry and supported changes to the party's rules and procedures to make hate crime a disciplinary offence. In July 2018, Labour, with Corbyn's support, agreed a code of conduct which excluded or amended some of the examples from the IHRA Working Definition of Antisemitism relating to Israel. Britain's three main Jewish newspapers jointly called a Corbyn-led government an "existential threat to Jewish life" in Britain.

Defenders, including Jewish Voice for Labour, have cited his record of opposing and campaigning against racism and antisemitism, and supporting Jewish communal initiatives. He organised a demonstration against a 1970s National Front march through Wood Green; spoke on the 80th anniversary of the Battle of Cable Street, noting that his mother was a protester; signed numerous early day motions condemning antisemitism; in 1987, campaigned to reverse Islington Council's decision to grant the planning application to destroy a Jewish cemetery; and in 2010, called on the UK government to facilitate the settlement of Yemeni Jews in Britain. He also took part in a ceremony in his Islington constituency to commemorate the original site of the North London Synagogue and visited the Theresienstadt Ghetto, calling it a reminder of the dangers of far-right politics, antisemitism and racism. In November 2019, John Bercow, the Jewish former Speaker of the House of Commons and Conservative MP, said that he had known Corbyn for 22 years, did not believe he was antisemitic and had never experienced antisemitism from a Labour Party member. UK academics 
criticised the media for "anti-Corbyn bias" in its coverage of the anti-Semitism debate which they said had been "weaponised" against Corbyn ahead of important elections. A September 2018 poll carried out by polling firm Survation, on behalf of the Jewish Chronicle, found that 86% of British Jews and 39% of the British public believed Corbyn to be anti-Semitic. A poll conducted in 2021 by YouGov, again on behalf of the Jewish Chronicle, found that 70% of Labour members dismissed the idea that the party had a problem with anti-Semitism, and 72% believe Corbyn should not have been expelled from the party. In May 2021, Jewish Voice for Labour published a report entitled How the EHRC Got It So Wrong: Antisemitism and the Labour Party. The report, which contained an introduction by Geoffrey Bindman, was critical of the EHRC investigation.

In November 2019, British intellectuals, writers and artists urged voters in a letter published in The Guardian to reject Corbyn in the impending general election, alleging an "association with antisemitism". The Labour Party responded by noting their own commitment to rooting out antisemitism and robust action dealing with it and that several of the signatories had themselves been accused of antisemitism, Islamophobia and misogyny and/or were Conservatives and Liberal Democrats. Another letter, supportive of Corbyn and published in the NME, was signed by thirty high profile figures, including Noam Chomsky, Brian Eno, Naomi Klein, Lowkey, Thurston Moore, Robert Del Naja, Maxine Peake, Mark Ruffalo, Mark Rylance, Alexei Sayle, Roger Waters, Vivienne Westwood and Yanis Varoufakis. The letter describes Corbyn as a "life-long committed anti-racist" and says that "no political party or political leader has done more to address (antisemitism) than Jeremy Corbyn and the Labour Party." A further letter in support of Corbyn, from a number of British Jews, mainly eminent academics, was published in The Guardian a few days later.

An internal Labour Party report, entitled The work of the Labour Party's Governance and Legal Unit in relation to antisemitism, 2014–2019, which was leaked to the media in April 2020, stated that Corbyn's team inherited a lack of "robust processes, systems, training, education and effective line management" as well as factional hostility towards Corbyn amongst former senior officials. This contributed to "a litany of mistakes" which "affected the expeditious and resolute handling of disciplinary complaints". The investigation, which was completed in March 2020, concluded there was "no evidence" of antisemitism complaints being treated differently to other forms of complaint, or of current or former staff being "motivated by antisemitic intent". It was later reported in The Guardian that the Labour Party's most senior lawyer had said that the report was deliberately misleading. The report also stated that Corbyn's office was not made aware of the scale of the antisemitism problem in the party because former General Secretary Iain McNicol, and other senior figures provided "false and misleading information" to his office. It found that McNicol and staff in the Governance and Legal Unit "provided timetables for the resolution of cases that were never met; falsely claimed to have processed all antisemitism complaints; falsely claimed that most complaints received were not about Labour members and provided highly inaccurate statistics of antisemitism complaints". The report also stated Sam Matthews, who was Head of Disputes and acting Head of the Governance and Legal Unit, "rarely replied or took any action" in relation to antisemitism complaints. It said the process for tackling antisemitism complaints improved when Jennie Formby became general secretary in 2018.

In July 2020, Corbyn said he was disappointed at the Labour Party's decision to apologise and financially settle defamation cases arising from its response to the July 2019 BBC Panorama programme Is Labour Anti-Semitic? The Labour Party (led by Corbyn at the time) had accused the show's presenter John Ware of having "invented quotes", which in the settlement they admitted had been untrue. Corbyn said that the Labour Party risked "giving credibility to misleading and inaccurate allegations about action taken to tackle anti-Semitism in the Labour Party in recent years" and that the settlements were a "political decision, not a legal one". A fundraising campaign, set up with an initial target of £20,000 to help Corbyn with legal fees related to Ware's action, surpassed £270,000 within a few days, eventually reaching over £370,000.

Former Corbyn advisor Andrew Murray suggested Corbyn may have struggled to empathise with the Jewish community during his leadership, stating: "He is very empathetic, Jeremy, but he's empathetic with the poor, the disadvantaged, the migrant, the marginalised. [...] Happily, that is not the Jewish community in Britain today." Corbyn raised the question in internal debates of whether there was a risk of giving the Jewish community 'special treatment'.

In 2021 Corbyn was a guest at the Cambridge Union. He was asked by the society's President, Joel Rosen, what he had done to stop Luciana Berger, a Jewish MP for Liverpool Wavertree, from being “hounded out” of the Labour party. Corbyn replied that Berger "was not hounded out of the party. She unfortunately decided to resign from the party."

Suspension from the Labour Party 
In October 2020, the EHRC announced that its investigation had found that the Labour Party had breached the Equality Act 2010 in three ways:
 Unlawful harassment by agents of the party; namely a councillor, Pam Bromley, and Ken Livingstone in his defence of Naz Shah,
 failure to provide appropriate training to those handling the complaints, and
 23 instances of "inappropriate involvement" by Corbyn's staff in antisemitism complaints. One of the complaints had been against Corbyn personally, regarding his response to the removal of the mural.

In response, Corbyn said his team's involvement in complaints was "to speed up, not hinder the process", that he did not accept all of the EHRC's findings, and that while "[o]ne antisemite is one too many", the scale of antisemitism within Labour had been "dramatically overstated for political reasons by our opponents inside and outside the party, as well as by much of the media". Corbyn was suspended from the Labour Party pending investigation by General Secretary David Evans when he failed to retract his remarks; he has said he will "strongly contest the political intervention to suspend [him]".

Trade union officials such as Len McCluskey and Dave Ward, wrestler Sami Zayn as well as politicians Claudia Webbe, Laura Pidcock, Ken Livingstone, Pablo Iglesias Turrión, Rafael Correa, Jill Stein, Diane Abbott, John McDonnell, Salma Yaqoob, Kate Osborne, Mercedes Villalba, Mary Foy, Nadia Whittome, Apsana Begum, Liam Byrne, Zarah Sultana and Richard Burgon called for the suspension to be revoked. Campaign group Momentum held a virtual rally entitled 'Stand with Corbyn' where they described Corbyn's suspension as "a naked attack on the left". On 31 October, the general secretaries of seven of Labour's affiliated trade unions (CWU, FBU, NUM, Unite, BFAWU, ASLEF and TSSA) published a joint statement calling the suspension "ill-advised and unjust". A YouGov poll found that 58% of respondents, including 41% of those who had voted Labour in 2019 under Corbyn's leadership, thought it was right to suspend him, with 13% (and 26% of Labour voters) disagreeing while 29% did not know.

On 17 November, Corbyn was given a formal warning and reinstated to the Labour Party. Starmer has not yet re-instated the whip to Corbyn. Corbyn received support from a number of Constituency Labour Parties (CLPs) around the country in response to Starmer's decision to remove the whip. The whip was suspended – initially for three months to allow an investigation to be conducted – however this suspension was still in place as of July 2021. On 26 November, Corbyn's lawyers lodged a pre-action disclosure application to the High Court as a prelude to taking legal action against the Labour Party for suspending the whip. The basis of Corbyn's claim is that he and Starmer had agreed to a deal to readmit him to the party. On 27 January 2021, the application for a pre-action disclosure was dismissed.

In September 2021, McCluskey wrote that Starmer had reneged on a deal to reinstate the whip to Corbyn in return for Corbyn agreeing to a statement that was co-written by senior Labour staff. McCluskey said he had provided a statement for Corbyn's legal challenge and would appear in court if required.

Media coverage
Analyses of domestic media coverage of Corbyn have found it to be critical or antagonistic. In July 2016, academics from the London School of Economics published a study of 812 articles about Corbyn taken from eight national newspapers around the time of his Labour leadership election. The study found that 75 percent of the articles either distorted or failed to represent his actual views on subjects. The study's director commented that "Our analysis shows that Corbyn was thoroughly delegitimised as a political actor from the moment he became a prominent candidate and even more so after he was elected as party leader".

Another report by the Media Reform Coalition and Birkbeck College in July 2016, based on 10 days of coverage around the time of multiple shadow cabinet resignations, found "marked and persistent imbalance" in favour of sources critical to him; the International Business Times was the only outlet that gave him more favourable than critical coverage.

In August 2016, a YouGov survey found that 97% of Corbyn supporters agreed that the "mainstream media as a whole has been deliberately biasing coverage to portray Jeremy Corbyn in a negative manner", as did 51% of the general "Labour selectorate" sample.

In May 2017, Loughborough University's Centre for Research in Communication and Culture concluded that the media was attacking Jeremy Corbyn far more than Theresa May during nine election campaign weekdays examined. The Daily Mail and Daily Express praised Theresa May for election pledges that were condemned when proposed by Labour in previous elections.

In February 2018, Momentum reported that attacks on Corbyn in the press were associated with increases in their membership applications. In September 2019, Labour leaders argued that traditional mainstream media outlets showed bias.

In December 2019, a study by Loughborough University found that British press coverage was twice as hostile to Labour and half as critical of the Conservatives during the 2019 general election campaign as it had been during the 2017 campaign.

In an interview with Middle East Eye in June 2020, Corbyn described the media's treatment of himself while he was Labour leader as obsessive and "at one level laughable, but all designed to be undermining". He said that the media coverage had diverted his media team from helping him pursue "a political agenda on homelessness, on poverty in Britain, on housing, on international issues" to "rebutting these crazy stories, abusive stories, about me the whole time". He said he considered suing as a result of media treatment but was guided by advice from Tony Benn, who told him, "Libel is a rich man's game, and you're not a rich man [...] Go to a libel case – even if you win the case, you'll be destroyed financially in doing so". Corbyn had in fact taken legal action against Conservative MP Ben Bradley during his leadership (see Other events).

Personal life
Corbyn lives in the Finsbury Park area of London. He has been married three times and divorced twice, and has three sons with his second wife. In 1974, he married his first wife, Jane Chapman, a fellow Labour Councillor for Haringey and now a professor at the University of Lincoln. They divorced in 1979. In the late 1970s, Corbyn had a brief relationship with Labour MP Diane Abbott.

In 1987, Corbyn married Chilean exile Claudia Bracchitta, granddaughter of Ricardo Bracchitta (Consul-General of Spain in Santiago), with whom he has three sons. He missed his youngest son's birth as he was lecturing National Union of Public Employees members at the same hospital. Following a difference of opinion about sending their son to a grammar school (Corbyn opposes selective education) they divorced in 1999 after two years of separation, although Corbyn said in June 2015 that he continues to "get on very well" with her. His son subsequently attended Queen Elizabeth's School, which had been his wife's first choice. Their second son, Sebastian, worked on his leadership campaign and was later employed as John McDonnell's Chief of Staff.

Corbyn's second oldest brother, Andrew, who was a geologist, died of a brain haemorrhage while in Papua New Guinea in 2001. Corbyn escorted the body from Papua New Guinea to Australia, where his brother's widow and children lived.

In 2012, Corbyn went to Mexico to marry his Mexican partner Laura Álvarez, who runs a fair trade coffee import business which has been the subject of some controversy. A former human rights lawyer in Mexico, she first met Corbyn shortly after his divorce from Bracchitta, having come to London to support her sister Marcela following the abduction of her niece to America by her sister's estranged husband. They contacted fellow Labour MP Tony Benn for assistance, who introduced them to Corbyn, who met with the police on their behalf and spoke at fundraisers until the girl was located in 2003. Álvarez then returned to Mexico, with the couple maintaining a long-distance relationship until she moved to London in 2011. Álvarez has described Corbyn as "not very good at house work but he is a good politician". They have a cat called El Gato ("The Cat" in Spanish), while Corbyn had previously owned a dog called Mango, described by The Observer in 1984 as his "only constant companion" at the time.

Corbyn named John Smith as the former Labour leader whom he most admired, describing him as "a decent, nice, inclusive leader". He also said he was "very close and very good friends" with Michael Foot.

Personal beliefs and interests
When interviewed by The Huffington Post in December 2015, Corbyn refused to reveal his religious beliefs and called them a "private thing", but denied that he was an atheist. He has said that he is "sceptical" of having a god in his life. He compared his concerns about the environment to a sort of "spiritualism". Corbyn has described himself as frugal, telling Simon Hattenstone of The Guardian, "I don't spend a lot of money, I lead a very normal life, I ride a bicycle and I don't have a car." He has been a vegetarian for nearly 50 years, after having volunteered on a pig farm in Jamaica when he was 19, and stated in April 2018 that he was considering becoming a vegan. Although he has been described in the media as teetotal, he said in an interview with the Daily Mirror that he does drink alcohol but "very, very little".

Corbyn is a member of the All-Party Parliamentary Group on Cycling. He enjoys reading and writing, and speaks fluent Spanish. He supports Arsenal FC, which is based in his constituency, and has signed parliamentary motions praising the successes of its men's and women's teams. He named Jens Lehmann, Ian Wright, and Dennis Bergkamp as his favourite Arsenal players, and has campaigned for the club to pay its staff a living wage. Corbyn is an avid "drain spotter" and has photographed decorative drain and manhole covers throughout the country.

Awards and recognition 
In 2013, Corbyn was awarded the Gandhi International Peace Award for his "consistent efforts over a 30-year parliamentary career to uphold the Gandhian values of social justice and non‐violence". In the same year, he was honoured by the Grassroot Diplomat Initiative for his "ongoing support for a number of non-government organisations and civil causes". Corbyn has won the Parliamentary "Beard of the Year Award" a record six times, as well as being named as the Beard Liberation Front's Beard of the Year, having previously described his beard as "a form of dissent" against New Labour.

In 2016, Corbyn was the subject of a musical entitled Corbyn the Musical: The Motorcycle Diaries, written by journalists Rupert Myers and Bobby Friedman.

In 2017 the American magazine Foreign Policy named Corbyn in its Top 100 Global Thinkers list for that year "for inspiring a new generation to re-engage in politics". In December 2017 he was one of three recipients awarded the Seán MacBride Peace Prize "for his sustained and powerful political work for disarmament and peace". The award was announced the previous September.

See also
 List of peace activists

References

Further reading

 Allen, Peter. "Political science, punditry, and the Corbyn problem". British Politics 15.1 (2020): 69–87 online.
 Bolton, Matthew. "Conceptual Vandalism, Historical Distortion: The Labour Antisemitism Crisis and the Limits of Class Instrumentalism". Journal of Contemporary Antisemitism 3.2 (2020) online .
 Bolton, Matt, and Frederick Harry Pitts, eds. Corbynism: A Critical Approach (Bingley: Emerald, 2018). 
 Bower, Tom. Dangerous Hero: Corbyn's Ruthless Plot for Power (2019) 
 Cammaerts, Bart, Brooks DeCillia, and João Carlos Magalhães. "Journalistic transgressions in the representation of Jeremy Corbyn: From watchdog to attackdog". Journalism 21.2 (2020): 191–208 online.
 Cawthorne, Nigel. Jeremy Corbyn: Leading from the Left. CreateSpace Independent Publishing Platform, 2015 
 
 Gilbert, W. Stephen. Jeremy Corbyn: Accidental Hero. London: Eyeware Publishing Ltd (Squint Books series), 2015. .
 Hedges, Paul, and Luca Farrow. "UK Elections: Jeremy Corbyn, Anti-Semitism, and Islamophobia". RSIS Commentaries (2 January 2020) online.

 Manwaring, Rob, and Evan Smith. "Corbyn, British labour and policy change". British Politics 15.1 (2020): 25–47 online.
 Mueller, Frank, Andrea Whittle, and Gyuzel Gadelshina. "The discursive construction of authenticity: The case of Jeremy Corbyn". Discourse, Context & Media 31 (2019): 100324 online.
 Prince, Rosa. Comrade Corbyn: A Very Unlikely Coup: How Jeremy Corbyn Stormed to the Labour Leadership (Biteback Publishing, 2016) 
 Seymour, Richard. Corbyn: The Strange Rebirth of Radical Politics. Verso Books, 2016.  
 Sinha, Paresha, Owain Smolović Jones, and Brigid Carroll. "Theorizing dramaturgical resistance leadership from the leadership campaigns of Jeremy Corbyn". Human Relations (2019): 0018726719887310. online
 Watts, Jake, and Tim Bale. "Populism as an intra-party phenomenon: The British Labour party under Jeremy Corbyn". British Journal of Politics and International Relations 21.1 (2019): 99–115 online
 Whiteley, Paul and others. "Oh Jeremy Corbyn! Why did Labour Party membership soar after the 2015 general election?". British Journal of Politics and International Relations 21.1 (2019): 80–98. online

External links

 
 
 
 

 
1949 births
Living people
Alumni of the University of North London
Amnesty International people
British anti-poverty advocates
British anti-racism activists
British anti–nuclear weapons activists
British environmentalists
British feminists
British human rights activists
British republicans
British socialists
British trade unionists
Councillors in the London Borough of Haringey
Ecosocialists
English anti-war activists
European democratic socialists
Gandhi International Peace Award recipients
Housing rights activists
Independent members of the House of Commons of the United Kingdom
Labour Party (UK) MPs for English constituencies
Leaders of the Labour Party (UK)
Leaders of the Opposition (United Kingdom)
Left-wing politics in the United Kingdom
Male feminists
Members of the Privy Council of the United Kingdom
People educated at Adams' Grammar School
People educated at Castle House School
People from Chippenham
People from Finsbury Park
People from Harringay
Politicians affected by a party expulsion process
Politics of the London Borough of Islington
UK MPs 1983–1987
UK MPs 1987–1992
UK MPs 1992–1997
UK MPs 1997–2001
UK MPs 2001–2005
UK MPs 2005–2010
UK MPs 2010–2015
UK MPs 2015–2017
UK MPs 2017–2019
UK MPs 2019–present